is a Japanese footballer who plays for Tochigi SC.

Playing career
Shuhei Kawata joined to Omiya Ardija in 2013. After three seasons with the Squirrels, he moved to Tochigi SC.

Club statistics
Updated to 23 February 2018.

References

External links
Profile at Tochigi SC

1994 births
Living people
Association football people from Saitama Prefecture
Japanese footballers
J1 League players
J2 League players
J3 League players
Omiya Ardija players
Tochigi SC players
Fujieda MYFC players
J.League U-22 Selection players
Association football goalkeepers